Karol Šmidke (January 21, 1897, Vítkovice (Ostrava), Austria-Hungary – December 15, 1952, Czechoslovakia) was a Slovak Communist politician, member of the Communist Party of Czechoslovakia.

Smidke was Co-President of the Presidium of the Slovak National Council (with Vavro Srobar) 5 September - ? 23 October 1944, Co-Speaker of the Slovak National Council (with Jozef Lettrich) 14 September 1945 - 26 February 1948, Acting Speaker from 26 February to 12 March 1948 and Speaker 12 March 1948 - 14 July 1950. He was also the first President of the Board of Commissioners from 18 September 1945 until 14 August 1946, when he was succeeded by Gustáv Husák.

References 

1897 births
1952 deaths
Politicians from Ostrava
People from the Margraviate of Moravia
Members of the Central Committee of the Communist Party of Czechoslovakia
Communist Party of Slovakia (1939) politicians
Members of the Chamber of Deputies of Czechoslovakia (1935–1939)
Members of the Interim National Assembly of Czechoslovakia
Members of the Constituent National Assembly of Czechoslovakia
Members of the National Assembly of Czechoslovakia (1948–1954)
Prime Ministers of Slovakia
Heroes of the Czechoslovak Socialist Republic